National Highway 702, commonly called NH 702 is a national highway in states of Nagaland and Assam in India. It is an offshoot of primary National Highway 2.

Route 
Chantongia, Longleng, Lonhching, Mon, Lapa, Tizit, Sonari, Sapekhati.

Junctions  

  Terminal near Chantongia.
  at Longleng.
  near Sapekhati.

See also 
 List of National Highways in India
 List of National Highways in India by state

References

External links
 NH 702 on OpenStreetMap

National highways in India
National Highways in Nagaland
National Highways in Assam